A snub is a refusal to recognise an acquaintance.  It may also refer to:

 Snub (geometry), an operation applied to a polyhedron
 Lawrence Snub Mosley (1905–1981), American jazz trombonist
 Snub Pollard, stage name of Australian-born silent film comedian Harry Fraser (1889–1962)
 Snub TV
 SNUB, a non-profit organisation aimed at stopping the urban sprawl of Norwich, UK
 Supernumerary nipples–uropathies–Becker's nevus syndrome or SNUB syndrome, a medical condition
 snub, a nautical term, meaning to suddenly stop a rope that is running out

See also

 Snubber, a fluidic, mechanical or electrical device used to suppress transients
 Snubbing, a type of heavy well intervention performed on oil and gas wells